Oliver Marach and Florin Mergea were the defending champions. Mergea did not participate this year, Marach partnered fellow Austrian Philipp Oswald.

Johan Brunström and Nicholas Monroe won the title, defeating Marach and Oswald in the final.

Seeds

Draw

References
 Main Draw

Geneva Open Challenger - Doubles
2014 Doubles